Kaikhosro (K'aikhosro Mukhranbatoni; died 3 October 1629) was a Georgian tavadi ("prince") of the House of Mukhrani, a collateral branch of the royal Bagrationi dynasty of Kartli. He was Prince (Mukhranbatoni) of Mukhrani, ex officio commander of the Banner of Shida Kartli, and regent of Kartli from 1625 to 1626. During the civil war in 1626, Kaikhosro sided with Giorgi Saakadze against Teimuraz I of Kakheti and followed him into exile in the Ottoman Empire, where they both, after three years of military service, were accused of treason and put to death.

Biography
Kaikhosro was a son of Vakhtang I, and a younger brother of Teimuraz I, on whose death at the battle of Marabda against Safavid Iran he succeeded to the fief of Mukhrani in 1625. Kaikhosro was allied with the warlord Giorgi Saakadze, who helped him to become regent of Kartli during the anti-Iranian rebellion to the chagrin of his rival Zurab, Duke of Aragvi. Zurab, suspicious of the tandem's designs and inclined to believe that his brother Giorgi, who was married to Kaikhosro's daughter, was part of a plot against him, had Giorgi blinded and made an alliance with Teimuraz I of Kakheti, whom Saakadze tried to prevent from acceding to the throne of Kartli.

The split in the ranks of Georgian nobility degenerated to a civil war in 1626. Saakadze and Kaikhosro were defeated by Teimuraz and his party at Bazaleti and fled to the Ottoman Empire, where they entered the sultan's military service. Mukhrani was taken over by Teimuraz I and given in possession to his son David, while children and nephews of Kaikhosro took refuge in western Georgia, in the Kingdom of Imereti. Saakadze and Kaikhosro both fell victim to intrigues at the Ottoman court. They were accused of treason and beheaded at the order of Grand Vizier Gazi Hüsrev Pasha in 1629.

Marriage and children
Prince Kaikhosro was married to Tinatin (died 1627), daughter of Mamia II Gurieli, Prince of Guria. They had three sons and three daughters:
 Prince Ashotan (died 1697), Prince of Mukhrani (1688–1692).
 Prince Bagrat. He was married to Ketevan, daughter of Prince Paremuz Amilakhvari, with two sons, Svimon and Nikoloz (the future bishop of Bolnisi). His posterity flourished until 1795.
 Prince Domenti (died 1676), Catholicos Patriarch of Georgia as Domentius III (1660–1676).  
 Princess Dedisimedi (died 1671). She was married to Papuna Tsitsishvili (died 1663), Prince of Lower Satsitsiano.
 Princess Elene (died after 1675). She was married to Giorgi (died after 1647), son of Nugzar I, Duke of Aragvi.
 Princess Tinatin. She was married to Prince Elizbar Davitishvili.

References 

1629 deaths
House of Mukhrani
Regents of Georgia
Year of birth unknown
17th-century people from Georgia (country)
Military personnel of the Ottoman Empire
People executed by the Ottoman Empire by decapitation